The women's shot put at the 2012 IPC Athletics European Championships was held at Stadskanaal Stadium from 24–28 July.

Medalists
Results given by IPC Athletics.

Results

F11/12

F20

F32/33

F34

F35/36

F37

F40/42/44

F54/55/56

F57/58

See also
List of IPC world records in athletics

References

shot put
2012 in women's athletics
Shot put at the World Para Athletics European Championships